The N8 is a national route in South Africa that connects Groblershoop (south-east of Upington) with Maseru in Lesotho via Kimberley and Bloemfontein. It is maintained by the South African National Roads Agency.

Route

Northern Cape
The road starts at Groblershoop in the Northern Cape (115 km south-east of Upington) at a junction with the N10. It runs east for 285 km, through Griquatown, crossing the Vaal River at Schmidtsdrift, to Kimberley (Capital of the Northern Cape). It enters as Schmidtsdrift Road, then Long Street, and reaches a junction with the N12, just west of the N12's intersection with the R64 (an alternative route to Bloemfontein).

It turns south-east to be co-signed with the N12 as Bultfontein Road up to the Bishops Road junction, where the N12 turns south, leaving the N8 as the south-easterly road. At the roundabout by Kimberley Boys High School, the N8 turns south as Oliver Street, then south-east as Nathan Street (where it bypasses the Kimberley Airport), to exit the Northern Cape and cross into the Free State province.

Free State
From Kimberley, the N8 goes eastwards for 150 kilometres, crossing the Modder River, through Petrusburg (where it meets the northern terminus of the R48), to Bloemfontein (Capital of the Free State and judicial capital of South Africa), where it meets the N1 Highway (Bloemfontein Western Bypass) at a ramp junction.

The N8 joins the N1 Highway northwards for 3 km up to the next off-ramp, where it meets the eastern terminus of the R64 (an alternative route from Kimberley). As the R64 is the road to the west, the N8 becomes the road to the east (Nelson Mandela Drive), bypassing the University of the Free State, into Bloemfontein Central. In the Bloemfontein CBD, the N8 passes through as two one-way streets (Nelson Mandela Drive westwards and Zastron Street eastwards). At the junction with the M30 Metropolitan Route, the N8 becomes one street eastwards again (Alexandra Avenue).

After the Bloemfontein town centre, the N8 heads eastwards to form an interchange with the M10 Metropolitan Route (George Lubbe Street) and proceeds to bypass the Bram Fischer International Airport and the Air Force Base Bloemspruit. From the airport, it runs eastwards for 78 kilometres, through Botshabelo and Thaba Nchu, to reach the southern outskirts of Ladybrand. Just before Ladybrand, the N8 is joined by the R26 Route and they are co-signed eastwards for 12 km up to the southern part of Ladybrand, where the N8 becomes its own road southwards while the R26 turns north towards Ladybrand CBD.

From the R26 split, the N8 goes southwards for 12 kilometres to end on the Lesotho border at the Maseru Bridge on the Mohokare River (Caledon River), with the city of Maseru, Lesotho's Capital, on the other side of the river.

References

External links

 National Roads Agency SA

National Roads in South Africa
Roads in South Africa